As of September 2021, the International Union for Conservation of Nature (IUCN) lists 3160 least concern amphibian species. 38% of all evaluated amphibian species are listed as least concern. 
No subpopulations of amphibians have been evaluated by the IUCN.

This is a complete list of least concern amphibian species as evaluated by the IUCN.

Salamanders
There are 162 salamander species assessed as least concern.

Lungless salamanders

Asiatic salamanders

Mole salamanders

Salamandrids

Proteids

Torrent salamanders
Southern torrent salamander (Rhyacotriton variegatus)

Amphiumids
Two-toed amphiuma (Amphiuma means)
Three-toed amphiuma (Amphiuma tridactylum)

Sirenids

Frogs
There are 2244 frog species assessed as least concern.

Robber frogs

Shrub frogs

Cryptic forest frogs

Rain frogs

True toads

Fleshbelly frogs

Glass frogs

Litter frogs

Screeching frogs

Hemiphractids

Cycloramphids

Poison dart frogs

Mantellids

Ceratobatrachids

Fork-tongued frogs

Alytids

Narrow-mouthed frogs

True frogs

Australian water frogs

Puddle frogs

Hylids

African reed frogs

Tongueless frogs

Pyxicephalids

Australian ground frogs

Ceratophryids

Odontophrynids

Ptychadenids

Southern frogs

Saddleback toads

American spadefoot toads

Hylodids

Other frog species

Gymnophiona

See also 
 Lists of IUCN Red List least concern species
 List of near threatened amphibians
 List of vulnerable amphibians
 List of endangered amphibians
 List of critically endangered amphibians
 List of recently extinct amphibians
 List of data deficient amphibians

References 

Amphibians
Least concern amphibians
Least concern amphibians